Khagaria Assembly constituency is an assembly constituency in Khagaria district in the Indian state of Bihar.  In 2015 Bihar Legislative Assembly election, Khagaria will be one of the 36 seats to have VVPAT enabled electronic voting machines.

Overview
As per Delimitation of Parliamentary and Assembly constituencies Order, 2008, No. 149 Khagaria Assembly constituency is composed of the following: Khagaria municipality; Mansi community development block; Bhadas Dakshini, Bhadas Uttari, Kasimpur, Mathurapur, Bachhouta, Sanhouli, Ranko, Sansarpur, Gourashakti, Marar Dakshni, Marar Uttari, Rasounk, Uttar Marar, Rahimpur Uttari, Rahimpur Madhya, Rahimpur Dakshin, Labhganva, Kothia gram panchayats of Khagaria CD Block.

Khagaria  Assembly constituency is part of No. 25 Khagaria (Lok Sabha constituency).

Members of Legislative Assembly

Election results

2020

2015

References

External links
 

Assembly constituencies of Bihar
Politics of Khagaria district